Korakas ("raven") can refer to:

 Korakas Peak, the highest peak of Mount Vardousia in Central Greece
 Michail Korakas (1797–1884), Cretan revolutionary leader
 Aristotelis Korakas (1858–), Greek general